Schubert Motorsport is a private motorsport team founded and owned by team principal and European Autocross champion Torsten Schubert, and headquartered in Oschersleben, Germany (near the Motorsport Arena). The team has operated as a BMW privateer since its inception in 1999 (except in 2018), with plenty of success, and has specialised in endurance racing since 2004. Although it is closely related to contract BMW associate Schubert Motors GmbH, also owned by Torsten Schubert, they are separate entities.

For much of its earlier years, Schubert focused on touring car racing, taking numerous championships and race wins, including a remarkable 5th-place result and class win at the 2006 Nürburgring 24 Hours. Only beginning in 2007 did Schubert Motorsport initiate regular competition in GT for BMW.

In 2012, after five years of GT racing, the manufacturer established Schubert as a works-assisted customer team of BMW, which allowed the team to receive benefits and advantages from the cooperation. Incidentally, the team ceased operating with touring cars at this time to focus their efforts on GT racing.

Separately, the team used slightly different names during its time. Beginning with the name of the sister company (Schubert Motors) and then the 'Schubert Motorsport' name, the team was well known for racing under the Need for Speed banner as Need for Speed by Schubert Motorsport (alternatively: Need for Speed Team Schubert) in 2010-2011. It carried the namesakes of its sponsors (like 'PIXUM', 'Saudi Falcons', and 'SX' in their respective series) and 'BMW Sports Trophy' for 2014-2015. Since 2016, the team has competed only as 'Schubert Motorsport'.

In 2018, Schubert Motorsport briefly operated as a Honda customer team, having made the switch from BMW and entering a pair of Honda NSX GT3s in the ADAC GT Masters (despite this, Schubert Motors GmbH continues the close relationship with BMW, but it is a separate entity). Nonetheless, Schubert returned to racing with BMW in the following year.

In 2022, for the first time in their history, Schubert Motorsport entered the DTM in light of the series adopting GT3-based specifications.

Milestones

1999 
 Debut in circuit racing.
 DTC (1 win)

2000 
 Contested entire DTC season.

2001 
 1st place DTC Drivers and Team classification (Markus Gedlich, BMW 320i)

2002 
 3rd place DTC Drivers classification (Claudia Hürtgen, BMW 320i)
 3rd place Guia Race (Franz Engstler, BMW 320i)

2003 
 1st place DTC Drivers and Team classification (Claudia Hürtgen, BMW 320i)
 1st place ETCC Independents' Championship (Duncan Huisman, BMW 320i)
 2nd place ETCC Independents' Championship (Tom Coronel, BMW 320i)

2004 
 1st place DPM (DTC) Drivers and Team classification (Claudia Hürtgen, BMW 320i)
 1st place ADAC Procar Series Drivers and Team classification (Hürtgen, BMW 320i)

2005 
 1st place VLN (Claudia Hürtgen, BMW 320i)
 ADAC Procar Series (3 wins)

2006 
 5th place overall and class win 24h race Nürburgring (Claudia Hürtgen, Marc Hennerici, Johannes Stuck, Torsten Schubert, BMW 120d)

2007 
 1st place Mini Challenge Deutschland (Joakim Mangs, Mini Cooper)
 1st place VLN Junior Trophy (Stian Sørlie, BMW 120d)
 1st place VLN Stahlwille Cup (Claudia Hürtgen, Hans-Joachim Stuck, Johannes Stuck, BMW Z4)

2008 
 1st place Toyo Tires 24H Series (Claudia Hürtgen, Stian Sørlie, Jörg Viebahn, BMW 120d, BMW Z4)
 15th place overall and class win 24h race Dubai (Hürtgen, Sørlie, Viebahn, BMW 120d)
 1st place 12h race Hungary (Hürtgen, Sørlie, Viebahn, BMW Z4)
 4th place overall and class win 12h race Hungary (Peter Posavac, Csaba Walter, Jacob Tackmann- Thomson, BMW 120d)
 Class win 24h race Nürburgring (Jörg Müller, Augusto Farfus, Fredrik Ekblom, BMW 320d)

2009 
 1st place 12h race Hungary (Stian Sørlie, Jörg Viebahn, Michael Outzen, BMW Z4)
 2nd place 24h race Dubai (Abdulaziz Al Faisal, Khaled Al Faisal, Marko Hartung, Claudia Hürtgen, BMW Z4)

2010 
 FIA GT3 European Championship (3 wins)
 3rd place FIA GT3 European Championship Team classification
 3rd place 24h race Dubai (Abdulaziz Al Faisal, Khaled Al Faisal, Marko Hartung, Claudia Hürtgen, BMW Z4 GT3)
 4th place 24h race Nürburgring (Hartung, Edward Sandström, Patrick Söderlund, Martin Öhlin, BMW Z4 GT3)

2011 
 FIA GT3 European Championship (1 win)
 2nd place FIA GT3 European Championship Team classification
 1st place 24h race Dubai (Augusto Farfus, Edward Sandström, Tommy Milner, Claudia Hürtgen, BMW Z4 GT3)
 1st place 24h race Barcelona (Sandström, Michael Outzen, Peter Posavac, Lars Stugemo, BMW Z4 GT3)
 2nd place 24h race Spa-Francorchamps (Qualified 49th), (Sandström, Dirk Werner, Hürtgen, BMW Z4 GT3)

2012 
 ADAC GT Masters (1 win)
 4th place 24h race Dubai (Faisal Binladen, Edward Sandström, Jörg Müller, Claudia Hürtgen, Abdulaziz Al Faisal, BMW Z4 GT3)
 VLN (1 win)
 Pole position in the 24h race Nürburgring (Uwe Alzen, BMW Z4 GT3)
 7th and 8th place 24h race Nürburgring

2013 
 ADAC GT Masters (3 wins)
 3rd place ADAC GT Masters Team classification
 VLN (1 win)
 6th place 24h race Nürburgring

2014 
 ADAC GT Masters (2 wins)
 6th place 24h race Nürburgring
 Blancpain Endurance Series (1 win)

2015 
 ADAC GT Masters (1 win)
 2nd place ADAC GT Masters Driver classification (Dominik Baumann, BMW Z4 GT3)
 3rd place ADAC GT Masters Driver classification (Jens Klingmann, BMW Z4 GT3)
 1st place ADAC GT Masters Team classification
 6th place 24h race Nürburgring

2016 
 VLN (1 win)
 First win for the BMW M6 GT3
 ADAC GT Masters

2017 
 Tested the BMW M4 GT4 for BMW Motorsport
 25th place 24h race Dubai (Qualified 49th, 5th in SPX class) (Ricky Collard, Jens Klingmann, Jörg Müller, BMW M4 GT4)
 GT4 European Series Southern Cup

2018 
 ADAC GT Masters
 Competed as Honda customer team

2019 
 (One-year hiatus from racing)

2020 
 ADAC GT Masters (1 win)
 Return to GT3 racing with BMW

2021 
 ADAC GT Masters
 20th place 24h race Nürburgring

2022 
 DTM (3 wins)
 1st place DTM Driver classification (Sheldon van der Linde, BMW M4 GT3)
 1st place DTM Team classification (Sheldon van der Linde, Philipp Eng)
 38th place 24h race Dubai

Results

ADAC GT Masters 
(key)

Deutsche Tourenwagen Masters

References 

German auto racing teams
BMW
BMW in motorsport
ADAC GT Masters teams
Blancpain Endurance Series teams
Auto racing teams established in 1999
1999 establishments in Germany
Deutsche Tourenwagen Masters teams